The Nagar Brahmin is a Hindu Brahmin subcaste mainly from the Indian state of Gujarat.

Author T. Sasaki says, Among Brahmins in Gujarat Nagar Brahmins were most prominent subdivision in the political, economic and social activities of this region both before and during the British period. They have occupied important administrative posts in the courts during the time of the Gujarat Sultanate and the Mughal Empire.

History 
The Brahmins mentioned in the Nidhanpur and Dubi inscriptions of king Bhaskaravarman bore surnames "which are at present used by Kayasthas of Bengal and Nagara Brahmins of Gujarat", and historians suggest the Bengali Kaysathas may have originated from the same group as Nāgar Brahmins.

During the rule of the Caulukya and Vāghela dynasties, the Nāgars held prestigious positions in royal courts along with Jains and other Brahmins. Their occupations included writing Sanskrit literature, performing Vedic rituals, and conducting royal funerals; they were also famed throughout India as pilgrimage officiants at tīrtha (holy water) sites.

The Nāgara Khaṇḍa is a quasi-caste purana for the Vadnagar Nāgars. It was partly composed before the late 13th century up to circa 17th century and was added to the existing Skanda Purāṇa, as part of a wider trend of adding mainly unrelated khaṇḍas to the text. The text extols the holy sites around Vaḍanagara (historically known as Ānarta, Ānandapura, and Camatkārapura). 

The Nāgars are divided into two sections: Gr̥hasthas who had received land grants from kings and did not have to work as priests, and Bhikṣus who earn money through alms from priesthood. In the Nāgarakhaṇḍa the Nāgars are divided into Nāgars who live in the city, and Bāhyas who had to live outside (often due to excommunication). 

The Vaḍanagara Praśasti states that in the time of King Kumārapāla, a wall was built around the town for the protection of the "viprapura" ("Brāḥmaṇa town").

According to the Vastupāla Carita of Jinaharṣa Gaṇi, the Vāghela king Vīsaladeva formed the branches of the Nāgars at a yajña (sacrifice) at Darbhavatīpura (modern Dabhoi), the branches being the Vīsalanagara, Ṣaṭpadra, Kr̥ṣṇapura, Citrapura, and Praśnika branches.

In the later periods many Nāgars also became financiers and moneychangers.

During the rule of the Gujarat Sultanate and Mughal Empire, the Nāgars learned Persian and held important posts in royal courts. Similarly under British rule, the Nāgars learned English and held administrative posts. 

In the late 19th century, many leaders of the Gujarat Vernacular Society were Nāgars, along with Vaniyas.

One notable member of the community was the educationist Hansa Jivraj Mehta, whose inter-caste marriage to Jivraj Narayan Mehta in the 1920s provoked what historian John R. Wood describes as a "mild sensation". Her husband was from the Bania caste.

Notable People 

 Ranchhodlal Chhotalal
 Hansa Jivraj Mehta

References

External links 

Nagar.org

Brahmin communities of Madhya Pradesh
Brahmin communities of Rajasthan
Brahmin communities of Gujarat
Brahmin communities of Karnataka
Brahmin communities of Uttar Pradesh